The 1972 Asia Golf Circuit was the eleventh season of golf tournaments that comprised the Asia Golf Circuit, formerly known as the Far East Circuit. 

Australian Graham Marsh won the circuit overall prize.

Schedule
The table below shows the 1972 Asia Golf Circuit schedule. There was one change from the previous season with the Sobu International Open replacing the cancelled Yomiuri International.

Final standings
The Asia Golf Circuit standings were based on a points system.

References

Asia Golf Circuit
Asia Golf Circuit